1st Anti-Aircraft Brigade, 1st Anti-Aircraft Artillery Brigade or 1st Antiaircraft Artillery Brigade may refer to:

 1st Anti-Aircraft Artillery Brigade (Brazil)
 1st Anti-Aircraft Artillery Brigade (People's Republic of China)
 1st Anti-Aircraft Artillery Brigade (Japan) (Ground Self-Defense Force)
 1st Anti-Aircraft Artillery Brigade (Romania) (World War II)
 1st Anti-Aircraft Brigade (Australia)
 1st Anti-Aircraft Brigade (Canada)
 1st Anti-Aircraft Brigade (Hungary)
 1st Anti-Aircraft Brigade (Imperial Japanese Army)
 1st Anti-Aircraft Brigade (South Africa)
 1st Anti-Aircraft Brigade, Royal Garrison Artillery, United Kingdom (1914 – 1920)
 1st Anti-Aircraft Brigade (United Kingdom) (1920 –1955)
 1st Indian Anti-Aircraft Brigade (British India)

See also
 1st Surface to Air Missiles Brigade (Romania)